Más fuerte que tu amor (English: Stronger Than Your love) is a Mexican telenovela produced by Ernesto Alonso for Telesistema Mexicano in 1966.

Cast 
Angélica María - Alicia 
Enrique Lizalde - Guillermo Fedei 
Raúl Ramírez
Enrique Rambal - Rey
Beatriz Aguirre - María Fedei 
Alicia Montoya - Solagne 
Héctor Andremar - Pedro de Gravena 
Jorge Vargas - Silvio
Antonio Bravo - Demetrio

References

External links 

Mexican telenovelas
1966 telenovelas
Televisa telenovelas
Spanish-language telenovelas
1966 Mexican television series debuts
1966 Mexican television series endings